Kiril Kounev (born 19 April 1968 in Galabovo) is a Bulgarian born Australian male weightlifter, competing in the 94 kg category and representing Australia at international competitions. He participated at the 1996 Summer Olympics in the 83 kg event and at the 2000 Summer Olympics in the 94 kg event. He competed at world championships, most recently at the 1999 World Weightlifting Championships.

Major results
 - 1990 World Championships Light-Heavyweight class (360.0 kg)
 - 1993 World Championships Light-Heavyweight class (372.5 kg)
 - 1989 World Championships Light-Heavyweight class (385.0 kg)
 - 1990 European Championships Light-Heavyweight class (370.0 kg)

References

External links
 

1968 births
Living people
Australian male weightlifters
Weightlifters at the 2000 Summer Olympics
Olympic weightlifters of Australia
Weightlifters at the 1996 Summer Olympics
Weightlifters at the 1994 Commonwealth Games
Weightlifters at the 1998 Commonwealth Games
Commonwealth Games gold medallists for Australia
Commonwealth Games medallists in weightlifting
World Weightlifting Championships medalists
Bulgarian emigrants to Australia
People from Stara Zagora Province
Medallists at the 1994 Commonwealth Games
Medallists at the 1998 Commonwealth Games